The Convention Between Great Britain and China Respecting Tibet was a treaty signed between the Qing dynasty and the British Empire in 1906, as a follow-on to the 1904 Convention of Lhasa between the British Empire and Tibet. It reaffirmed the Chinese possession of Tibet after the British expedition to Tibet in 1903–1904. The British agreed not to annex or interfere in Tibet in return for indemnity from the Chinese government, while China engaged "not to permit any other foreign state to interfere with the territory or internal administration of Tibet".

See also 
 Tibet under Qing rule
 Chinese expedition to Tibet (1720)
 British expedition to Tibet (1903–1904)
 Treaty of Lhasa (1904)
 Chinese expedition to Tibet (1910)
 Simla Convention (1913–1914)

References

External links 

 Convention Between Great Britain and China Respecting Tibet
 
 
 

China–United Kingdom relations
Treaties of the Qing dynasty
Treaties of the United Kingdom (1801–1922)
20th century in Tibet
1906 in the British Empire
1906 in China
1906 treaties
Tibet–United Kingdom relations
China–Tibet relations